Best of the Worst: 93-97 is a two LP/CD compilation album by Memphis garage-rock band, the Oblivians. It was released on September 28, 1999 by Sympathy for the Record Industry. The album features career-spanning and previously unreleased Oblivians rarities, B-sides, and live cuts. The liner notes, chronicling the band's roots, formation, and various anecdotes, were written by '68 Comeback founder Jeffrey Evans. []

Track listing 
"Siamese Purse" (Memphis Studio, 1995) - 2:24
"Alcoholic" (Home Studio, 1994) - 1:52
"Indian in Me" (Memphis Studio, 1995) - 3:07
"Tear Drop for You" (Home Studio, 1994) - 2:57
"Bald Headed Woman" (Memphis Studio, 1995) - 1:55
"Peepin' & Hidin'" (Live On WMFU, 1997) - 3:08
"Don't Haunt Me" (Easley Studio, 1995) - 3:11
"I Got Something to Say" (Easley Studio, 1995) - 1:27
"Lady, Oh Lady" (Live On WMFU, 1997) - 2:24
"Roadrunner" (Live On WMFU, 1997) - 3:03
"Hey Ma, Look at Sis" (Live On WMFU, 1997) - 2:14
"Talk To Me" (Joe Seneca Cover) (Easley Studio, 1995) - 3:20
"Robot Blues" (Easley Studio, 1995) - 2:24
"Locomotion" (Live In Hambug, 1995) - 2:11
"Oh, How To Do" (Monks Cover) (Live In Oxford, Ms 1995) - 2:39
"Shut My Mouth" (Live In Hamburg, 1995) - 2:08
"Losing Hand" (Royal Pendletons Cover) (Live In Hamburg, 1995) - 2:34
"Pill Popper Part I & II" (Live On WMFU, 1997) - 4:04
"Live the Life" (Live On WMFU, 1997) - 3:54
"Alone Again Or" (Love Cover) (Live On WEVL, 1993) - 3:21
"Kick Your Ass" (Live In Oxford, Ms 1995) - 1:37
"Mad Lover" (Live In Hamburg, 1995) - 1:37
"Blew My Cool" (Live On WMFU, 1997) - 1:54
"Never Change" (Live In Hamburg, 1995) - 3:29
"Everybody But Me" (Easley Studio, 1995) - 1:45

References
 Graves, Karen E. [ "The Best of the Worst: 93-97"] "www.allmusic.com". Accessed May 28, 2007

1999 compilation albums